Aplahanda was a king of Carchemish proposed to have reigned between 1786 and 1766 BCE.

He was first known from a cylinder seal translated by Rene Dussaud in 1929. The seal was found at the base of the mound of Ugarit before excavations began.

At least 6 seals naming Aplahanda have been published. They are skilfully produced, and show mostly Babylonian influence, although some Syrian and Egyptian motifs are also present.

He is also found mentioned in the Mari tablets, reigning at the same time as Yasmah-Addu and Zimri-Lim, by whom he is addressed as a brother. His name was suggested to be Amorite by I. J. Gelb and the hypothesis of a Semitic origin was supported by Wilfred G. Lambert.

He was allied with Shamshi-Adad in a war against Aleppo that was unsuccessful.

Aplahanda was succeeded by his son, Yatar-Ami, who ruled for only two years. He is known to have died in 1766 from a letter of Ishtaran-Nasir.

His daughter called Matrunna is also known; she had a non-Semitic, possibly Hurrian name.

His other son was Yahdul-Lim.

References

18th-century BC rulers
Kings of Carchemish